{{DISPLAYTITLE:C6H5NO3}}
The molecular formula C6H5NO3 (molar mass: 139.11 g/mol, exact mass: 139.0269 u) may refer to:

 3-Hydroxypicolinic acid
 4-Nitrophenol